This is a season-by-season list of records compiled by St. Cloud State in men's ice hockey.

St. Cloud State has made 15 appearances in the NCAA Tournament Reaching the Frozen Four in both 2013 & 2021.

Season-by-season results

Note: GP = Games played, W = Wins, L = Losses, T = Ties

* Winning percentage is used when conference schedules are unbalanced.

Footnotes

References

 
St. Cloud State
St. Cloud State Huskies ice hockey seasons